Hirnyk is a surname of Ukrainian origin. It literally means a miner (occupation).

Notable Hirnyks
 Oleksa Hirnyk (1912–1978), Hero of Ukraine, a Soviet dissident, burned himself in protest against Russification

See also
 Eastern Slavic naming customs

External links
 The origin of names and surnames

Ukrainian-language surnames